The Yongin Football Center is a football youth academy located in Yongin, South Korea.

Facilities 
Yongin Football Center has football-specific stadium and training facilities and was built in 2003. It has five football pitches, two of which are natural turf, and three that are artificial turf pitches. It was the home ground of Yongin City FC from 2010 to 2016.

External links
 Official website 

Football venues in South Korea
Yongin
Buildings and structures in Yongin
Sports venues in Gyeonggi Province
Sports venues completed in 2003
2003 establishments in South Korea
Sport in Yongin